Tom Cant (born 13 June 2002) is an Australian professional rugby league footballer who currently plays for the Newcastle Knights in the National Rugby League.

Background
Born in East Maitland, New South Wales, Cant played his junior rugby league for the East Maitland Griffins, before being signed by the Newcastle Knights.

Playing career

Early years
Cant rose through the ranks for the Newcastle Knights, playing with their Harold Matthews Cup team in 2018, the S. G. Ball Cup side from 2019 to 2021 and finally the Jersey Flegg Cup team in 2022, captaining the side that year.

2023
In 2023, Cant got the chance to play in both the Knights' NRL trial matches during the pre-season. In round 3 of the 2022 NRL season, he made his NRL debut for the Knights against the Dolphins.

References

External links
Newcastle Knights profile

2002 births
Australian rugby league players
Newcastle Knights players
Maitland Pickers players
Rugby league second-rows
Rugby league centres
Living people